Martin Hlavačka (born September 21, 1975) is a Czech professional ice hockey player who played with HC Slovan Bratislava in the Slovak Extraliga. He currently plays for HK Nitra. Hlavačka previously played for HC Dukla Trenčín in Slovakia and several teams in Czech Extraliga, namely HC Zlín, HC Karlovy Vary, HC Sparta Praha, HC Bílí Tygři Liberec and HC Slavia Praha. He also played for Ilves Tampere in Finland and Torpedo Yaroslavl in Russia.

Career statistics

References

External links

1975 births
Living people
Czech ice hockey defencemen
People from Hodonín
Graz 99ers players
SHK Hodonín players
HC Bílí Tygři Liberec players
HC Karlovy Vary players
HC Slavia Praha players
HC Slovan Bratislava players
HC Sparta Praha players
HC ZUBR Přerov players
HK Dubnica players
HK Dukla Trenčín players
HK Nitra players
Ilves players
Lokomotiv Yaroslavl players
Sportspeople from the South Moravian Region
Czech expatriate ice hockey players in Russia
Czech expatriate ice hockey players in Slovakia
Czech expatriate ice hockey players in Finland
Czech expatriate sportspeople in Austria
Expatriate ice hockey players in Austria